Brain Freeze is a Canadian horror comedy film, directed by Julien Knafo and released in 2021.

A satire of class warfare, the film is set in a gated community in Montreal where the neighbourhood golf course has sprayed its grounds with a new experimental fertilizer that automatically melts the snow in winter so that its rich patrons can play golf all year round, but which in turn has contaminated the local water supply and is turning the residents into zombies. Against this backdrop, teenager André (Iani Bédard) must team up with survivalist Dan (Roy Dupuis) to protect themselves and André's baby sister Annie.

The film's cast also includes Marianne Fortier, Anne-Élisabeth Bossé, Claudia Ferri, Mylène Mackay, Stéphane Crête, Mahée Paiement and Simon Olivier Fecteau.

It premiered as the opening film of the 2021 Fantasia Film Festival.

References

External links

Brain Freeze at Library and Archives Canada

2021 films
Canadian zombie comedy films
Canadian comedy horror films
Canadian satirical films
Films shot in Quebec
Films set in Quebec
Quebec films
French-language Canadian films
2020s Canadian films
2021 comedy horror films
2020s French-language films